Aurora is the name of some places in the U.S. state of Wisconsin:
Aurora, Florence County, Wisconsin, a town
Aurora (community), Florence County, Wisconsin, an unincorporated community
Aurora, Kenosha County, Wisconsin, a ghost town of Kenosha County, Wisconsin
Aurora, Taylor County, Wisconsin, a town
Aurora, Washington County, Wisconsin, an unincorporated community
Aurora, Waushara County, Wisconsin, a town
Auroraville, Wisconsin, an unincorporated community